"Granada" is a song written in 1932 by Mexican composer Agustín Lara. The song is about the Spanish city of Granada and has become a standard in music repertoire.

The most popular versions are the original with Spanish lyrics by Lara (often sung operatically); a version with English lyrics by Australian lyricist Dorothy Dodd; and instrumental versions in jazz, pop, easy listening, flamenco or rock styles. Other versions in English also exist (one with lyrics by Al Stewart, and one with lyrics by Robert Musel and Edward Lisbona) but these are less common. There are also versions in German and other languages.

The song has been covered many times. It is José Carreras's signature tune. Popular versions include those by Plácido Domingo, Frankie Laine, Jorge Negrete, Juan Arvizu, Nestor Mesta Chayres, Mario Lanza, Pasquale Esposito, Bing Crosby and Frank Sinatra. It has been sung in Italian by Claudio Villa, and in German by Fritz Wunderlich and Spanish pop-duo Baccara. During the international tour of The Three Tenors, "Granada" was the only song that all three singers––Plácido Domingo, Luciano Pavarotti, and José Carreras––all performed as a solo in different concerts.

The plenary session of the City Council of Granada, unanimously, agreed in its session on September 4, 1997 to establish the version adapted by Professor D. Luis Megías Castilla of this song as the official anthem of the City of Granada.

Lyrics
Lara's lyrics are:
Granada tierra soñada por mí,
mi cantar se vuelve gitano
cuando es para ti.

Mi cantar, hecho de fantasía,
mi cantar, flor de melancolía,
que yo te vengo a dar.

Granada, tierra ensangrentada
en tardes de toros,
mujer que conserva el embrujo
de los ojos moros.

Te sueño rebelde y gitana,
cubierta de flores
y beso tu boca de grana,
jugosa manzana
que me habla de amores.

Granada, manola cantada
en coplas preciosas,
no tengo otra cosa que darte
que un ramo de rosas.

De rosas, de suave fragancia
que le dieran marco a la virgen morena.

Granada, tu tierra está llena
de lindas mujeres,
de sangre y de sol.

Dodd's version begins:
Granada, I'm falling under your spell,
Jazz
Jazz if you could speak, what a fascinating tale you would tell.

Selective list of recorded versions

1932 Juan Arvizu with Orchestral ensemble for Victor Records
1944 Carlos Ramírez with Xavier Cugat's Orchestra, from the US film Two Girls and a Sailor (Spanish lyrics). Cugat recorded an instrumental version in 1958.
1946 Nestor Mesta Chayres – (Spanish lyrics) with the Alfredo Antonini Orchestra for Decca Records
1947 Deanna Durbin – Spanish lyrics (performed in the movie I'll Be Yours)
1949 Mario Lanza
1951 Desi Arnaz
1951 Bing Crosby – English lyrics – recorded February 5, 1951 with the Bando Da Lua for Decca Records
1954 Luís Piçarra
1954 Claudio Villa – Italian lyrics
1954 Frankie Laine, US #17 – English lyrics
1954 Tommy Dorsey – big band instrumental
1956 Caterina Valente – in English, French and Spanish
1956 Pérez Prado
1956 John Serry Sr. – accordion with instrumental ensemble (see Squeeze Play)
1958 Percy Faith – easy listening instrumental
1958 The Four Freshmen – Voices in Latin – English lyrics
1958 Jan Peerce
1958 Mario Del Monaco – with studio orchestra (Decca)
1958 Niño de Murcia
1959 Jane Morgan
1959 Alfredo Kraus
1960 Connie Francis – Spanish lyrics
1961 Ben E. King – English lyrics (on the album Spanish Harlem, US #57)
1961 Frank Sinatra, US #64 – English lyrics
1961 Al Martino, – Spanish lyrics
1961 Arthur Lyman – instrumental
1960s Fritz Wunderlich
1962 Hugo Avendaño – Spanish lyrics
1962 Grant Green on The Latin Bit – jazz instrumental
1963 The Shadows – Los Shadows
1963 Edmundo Ros – English lyrics
1963 Trini Lopez – English lyrics (Trini Lopez at PJ's)
1963 Peter Nero – piano instrumental
1964 Vikki Carr – Spanish lyrics
1964 Trini Lopez – Spanish lyrics (The Latin Album)
1964 Johnny Mathis – Spanish lyrics (Olé)
1965 Nicolai Gedda
1960s The Tornados – rock instrumental
1960s Violetta Villas – Spanish lyrics, opera vocalization
1967 [John Gary] - English lyrics, vocals and orchestra
1967 Paco de Lucía – flamenco guitar
1969 Hugo Winterhalter – easy listening
1970 Sergio Franchi – Spanish & English lyrics (UA single, and UA album Within Me)
1972 Muslim Magomaev
1976 Karel Gott – Czech lyrics
1976 Donna Hightower – disco version
1977 Baccara – disco version, Spanish lyrics
1978 Luisa Fernandez – disco version, Spanish lyrics
1979 Al Bano – Spanish & English lyrics
1989 The Red Army Chorus
1990 José Carreras – Spanish lyrics
1991 Plácido Domingo – Spanish lyrics
1993 Carlos Montoya – flamenco guitar
1997 Gato Barbieri – jazz saxophone
1998 John Farnham & Anthony Warlow – Spanish & English lyrics
2002 Tania Maria – jazz piano
2003 Russell Watson – Spanish lyrics – from the album Reprise
2004 Mnozil Brass – English lyrics
2005 Brad Mehldau Trio – jazz piano
2005 Masafumi Akikawa – Spanish lyrics
2006 Katherine Jenkins – mezzo-soprano, English lyrics
2007 True Symphonic Rockestra – Spanish lyrics
2007 Mario Frangoulis – Spanish lyrics
2008 The Canadian Tenors – Spanish lyrics
2010 Mark Vincent for his 2010 album Compass
2011 Joe McElderry – Spanish lyrics
2011 Il Volo – Spanish lyrics
2015 Canadian Brass – Chris Coletti on trumpet
2015 Aled Wyn Davies – Spanish lyrics
2016 Carlos Marín (Il Divo) – Spanish lyrics
Bryn Terfel – Spanish lyrics
Eydie Gormé
Juan García Esquivel – instrumental
Howard Morrison
Jay and the Americans
Jerry Vale
Juan Diego Flórez – Spanish lyrics
Julian Bream – classical guitar
Luciano Pavarotti – Spanish lyrics
Luciano Pavarotti & Jon Secada – Spanish lyrics
Mantovani – easy listening instrumental
James Last
Ted Heath
Renata Tebaldi – Spanish lyrics
Stan Kenton – big band instrumental
The Ten Tenors – Spanish lyrics
Maurice André – piccolo trumpet
Yoyoy Villame – parody English and Filipino lyrics
André Rieu – instrumental
Joselito – Spanish lyrics

References

1932 songs
APRA Award winners
Spanish-language songs
Pop standards
Mexican songs
Songs with music by Agustín Lara
Songs about Spain
Mario Lanza songs